Under United States law, Biological select agents or toxins (BSATs) — or simply select agents for short — are bio-agents which (since 1997) have been declared  by the U.S. Department of Health and Human Services (HHS) or by the U.S. Department of Agriculture (USDA) to have the "potential to pose a severe threat to public health and safety". The agents are divided into (1) HHS select agents and toxins affecting humans; (2) USDA select agents and toxins affecting agriculture; and (3) overlap select agents and toxins affecting both.

The U.S. Centers for Disease Control and Prevention (CDC) regulates the laboratories which may possess, use, or transfer select agents within the United States in its Select Agent Program (SAP) — also called the Federal Select Agent Program (FSAP) — since 2001. The SAP was established to satisfy requirements of the USA PATRIOT Act of 2001 and the Public Health Security and Bioterrorism Preparedness and Response Act of 2002, which were enacted in the wake of the September 11, 2001 attacks and the subsequent 2001 anthrax attacks.

Using BSATs in biomedical research prompts concerns about dual use. The federal government created the National Science Advisory Board for Biosecurity which promotes biosecurity in life science research. It is composed of government, education and industry experts who provide policy recommendations on ways to minimize the possibility that knowledge and technologies emanating from biological research will be misused to threaten public health or national security.

Regulation
The CDC has regulated the laboratories which may possess, use, or transfer select agents within the United States under the SAP since 2001. The SAP was established to satisfy requirements of the USA PATRIOT Act of 2001 and the Public Health Security and Bioterrorism Preparedness and Response Act of 2002, which were enacted in the wake of the September 11, 2001 attacks and the subsequent 2001 anthrax attacks.

Using select agents in biomedical research prompts concerns about dual use. The federal government created the National Science Advisory Board for Biosecurity to promote biosecurity in life science research.  It is composed of government, education and industry experts who provide policy recommendations on ways to minimize the possibility that knowledge and technologies emanating from biological research will be misused to threaten public health or national security.

Violations
In July 2015, Gregory E. Demske, chief counsel to the inspector general in the HHS Office of Inspector General (OIG), testified that 30 civil violations of the SAP rules had been identified in the past 13 years, and that violators had paid about $2.4 million in fines. He explained that when the CDC's Division of Select Agents and Toxins detects possible SAP misconduct by an HHS worker, it coordinates with the OIG to gather facts. If it concludes that a civil violation might have occurred, it turns the case over to the OIG for possible enforcement. But if it suspects a crime, it pursues the matter with the FBI. Since passage of the Bioterrorism Act of 2002, the OIG had received 68 referrals from the CDC for possible Select Agent enforcement and found violations in 30 of those cases. Notices of violation were sent to 5 federal entities, 3 universities, and 2 other private organizations, all unnamed in his testimony. Demske remarked that no federal agencies had been fined for SAP violations.

List of select agents
Tier 1 BSATs are indicated by an asterisk (*).

HHS select agents and toxins

Bacteria
Botulinum neurotoxin-producing species of Clostridium*
Coxiella burnetii
Burkholderia mallei* (formerly Pseudomonas mallei)
Burkholderia pseudomallei* (formerly Pseudomonas pseudomallei)
Francisella tularensis*
Rickettsia prowazekii
Rickettsia rickettsii
Yersinia pestis*

Viruses

Coronavirus:
SARS-associated coronavirus (SARS-CoV)
Encephalitis viruses:
Eastern equine encephalitis virus (excluding South American genotypes)
Tick-borne encephalitis-complex viruses (3 subtypes, excluding European ones)
Central European tick-borne encephalitis virus
Far-Eastern tick-borne encephalitis virus
Russian spring and summer encephalitis virus
Influenza viruses:
Highly Pathogenic Avian Influenza H5N1 virus
Reconstructed 1918 influenza virus
Orthopoxviruses:
Monkeypox virus
Variola major virus* (smallpox virus)
Variola minor virus* (Alastrim)
Viral hemorrhagic fever (VHF) viruses:
African VHF viruses:
Crimean–Congo hemorrhagic fever virus
Ebola virus*
Lassa fever virus
Lujo virus
Marburg virus*
Asian VHF viruses:
Kyasanur Forest disease virus
Omsk hemorrhagic fever virus
South American VHF viruses:
Chapare virus
Guanarito virus (Venezuelan hemorrhagic fever)
Junin virus (Argentine hemorrhagic fever)
Machupo (Bolivian hemorrhagic fever)
Sabiá virus (Brazilian hemorrhagic fever)

Toxins
 these biological agents and toxins are considered to "have the potential to pose a severe threat to both human and animal health, to plant health, or to animal and plant products".
Abrin
Botulinum neurotoxins*
Clostridium perfringens epsilon toxin
Conotoxins
Ricin
Saxitoxin
Staphylococcal enterotoxins
Tetrodotoxin
2 Type A trichothecenes:
Diacetoxyscirpenol
T-2 toxin

Overlap select agents and toxins

Bacteria
 Bacillus anthracis*
 Brucella abortus
 Brucella melitensis
 Brucella suis
 Burkholderia mallei* (formerly Pseudomonas mallei)
 Burkholderia pseudomallei* (formerly Pseudomonas pseudomallei)

Viruses
 Hendra virus
 Nipah virus
 Rift Valley fever virus
 Venezuelan equine encephalitis virus (excluding enzootic subtypes ID and IE)

USDA select agents and toxins

For animals

Bacteria
 Mycoplasma mycoides subspecies mycoides small colony (Mmm SC) (contagious bovine pleuropneumonia)

Viruses
 African horse sickness virus
 African swine fever virus
 Avian influenza virus (highly pathogenic)
 Classical swine fever virus
 Foot-and-mouth disease virus*
 Lumpy skin disease virus
 Peste des petits ruminants virus
 Rinderpest virus*
 Swine vesicular disease virus
 Virulent Newcastle disease virus 1

For plants

Bacteria
Ralstonia solanacearum race 3, biovar 2
Rathayibacter toxicus
Xanthomonas oryzae
Xylella fastidiosa (citrus variegated chlorosis strain)

Fungi or fungus-like pathogens
Peronosclerospora philippinensis (Peronosclerospora sacchari)
Phoma glycinicola (formerly Pyrenochaeta glycines)
Sclerophthora rayssiae var zeae
Synchytrium endobioticum

List of former select agents
Select agent regulations were revised in October 2012 to remove 19 BSATs from the list (7 Human and Overlap Agents and 12 Animal Agents).

Human and overlap agents
Cercopithecine herpesvirus 1 (Herpes B virus)
Coccidioides posadasii
Coccidioides immitis
Eastern equine encephalitis virus, South American genotypes
Flexal virus
Tick-borne encephalitis viruses, European subtypes
Venezuelan equine encephalitis virus, enzootic subtypes ID and IE

Animal agents
Akabane virus
Bluetongue virus
Bovine spongiform encephalitis
Camel Pox virus
Erlichia ruminantium
Goat Pox virus
Japanese encephalitis virus
Malignant Catarrhal Fever virus (Alcelaphine herpesvirus type 1)
Menangle virus
Mycoplasma capricolum subspecies capripneumoniae (contagious caprine pleuropneumonia)
Sheep Pox virus
Vesicular stomatitis virus (exotic): Indiana subtypes VSV-IN2, VSV-IN3

See also
Biological agent
Biosecurity in the United States
U.S. biological defense program

References

Further reading

External links
 – The FSAP is composed jointly of the Centers for Disease Control and Prevention/Division of Select Agents and Toxins and the Animal and Plant Health Inspection Service/Agriculture Select Agent Services, and oversees the possession, use and transfer of biological select agents and toxins. 
 A federal advisory committee that addresses issues related to biosecurity and dual use research at the request of the United States Government.

United States Department of Health and Human Services
Toxins
Biosecurity